In multi-objective optimization, the Pareto front (also called Pareto frontier or Pareto curve) is the set of all Pareto efficient solutions. The concept is widely used in engineering. It allows the designer to restrict attention to the set of efficient choices, and to make tradeoffs within this set, rather than considering the full range of every parameter.

Definition 
The Pareto frontier, P(Y), may be more formally described as follows.

We assume that the preferred directions of criteria values are known. The Pareto frontier is thus written as:

Marginal rate of substitution 
A significant aspect of the Pareto frontier in economics is that, at a Pareto-efficient allocation, the marginal rate of substitution is the same for all consumers. A formal statement can be derived by considering a system with m consumers and n goods, and a utility function of each consumer as  where  is the vector of goods, both for all i. To find the Pareto optimal allocation, we maximize the Lagrangian:

 

 

 

The above first-order condition imply that

 

Thus, in a Pareto-optimal allocation, the marginal rate of substitution must be the same for all consumers.

Computation 
Algorithms for computing the Pareto frontier of a finite set of alternatives have been studied in computer science and power engineering. They include:

 "The maximum vector problem" or the skyline query.
 "The scalarization algorithm" or the method of weighted sums.
 "The -constraints method".

Approximations 
Since generating the entire Pareto front is often computationally-hard, there are algorithms for computing an approximate Pareto-front. For example, Legriel et al. call a set S an ε-approximation of the Pareto-front P, if the directed Hausdorff distance between S and P is at most ε. They observe that an ε-approximation of any Pareto front P in d dimensions can be found using (1/ε)d queries.

Zitzler, Knowles and Thiele compare several algorithms for Pareto-set approximations on various criteria, such as invariance to scaling, monotonicity, and computational complexity.

References

External links 
 Code to compute the Pareto front of a finite set of points in Julia: https://github.com/cossio/ParetoEfficiency.jl.

Power engineering
Pareto efficiency